Stade René Hologne is a stadium located in Vesoul, in Haute-Saône (France). It is the home stadium of the football club Vesoul Haute-Saône and its capacity is approximately 6,000.

Sport in Vesoul
Sports venues in Haute-Saône